Julio Gil Bado (born 3 June 1983) is a Spanish-Gibraltarian footballer who currently plays for Gibraltar National League side Mons Calpe, where he plays as a midfielder. He has one cap for the Gibraltar national team.

International career
Bado made his international debut with Gibraltar on 19 November 2013 in a 0–0 home draw with Slovakia. This was Gibraltar's first game since being admitted to UEFA

International career statistics

References

1983 births
Living people
People from Campo de Gibraltar
Sportspeople from the Province of Cádiz
Footballers from Andalusia
Gibraltarian footballers
Gibraltar international footballers
Spanish footballers
Spanish people of Gibraltarian descent
Association football midfielders
Lynx F.C. players
Manchester 62 F.C. players
Glacis United F.C. players
Mons Calpe S.C. players
F.C. Boca Gibraltar players
Gibraltar United F.C. players
Europa Point F.C. players
Gibraltar Premier Division players
Gibraltar National League players